Ponthir is a village and community at the south-west of the county borough of Torfaen on the boundary of the counties of Monmouthshire and Newport. It is approximately six miles from Newport city centre and 3½ miles from Cwmbran, lying between the settlements of Caerleon and Llanfrechfa.

Etymology 
The Welsh language placename indicates the correct pronunciation; i.e. saying the 't' and 'h' separately. The name first appeared in print as Pontheere in 1605 and again as Pont hir in 1677. The name means 'long (hir)  bridge (pont)' and refers to a previous bridge over the Afon Lwyd, the present one having been built in 1800.

History and amenities 
Ponthir is primarily a residential area, with several new housing estates around the older village. It has a primary school, (Ponthir Church in Wales Primary School) which was for some time under threat of closure but was reprieved, and it now has the best SATs results in Torfaen. It also changed its category to a Voluntary aided school (church) school.

Ponthir has many amenities such as two nurseries, two children's playgrounds, two churches, a village hall, a cricket club, a football club (Ponthir AFC), 2 pubs - The Ponthir House and The Star, a grocery shop, a doctor and a dentist. There used to be a railway station but it closed in 1962. The railway is still in use. It is surrounded by the rolling hills of Monmouthshire, many farms, and a few rivers, streams and brooks that surround or run through the village, such as; The Afon Llwyd (meaning "grey river") as well as The Sôr Brook, Cwm-ffrwd Brook and Candwr Brook

A Welsh Water sewage and water treatment plant for the surrounding area is located here, and this was where bacteria were first used to treat sewage sludge using an electrically powered aerator to circulate the sludge and ensure good microbial digestion. This process saved the local authority money as well as reducing noxious odours.

Notable people
Notable people who were born, resided or were schooled in Ponthir, include the following:

 James Ball (cyclist), Great Britain Para-cyclist
 James Botham, Welsh international rugby union player, who currently plays for the Cardiff Blues. Grandson of England cricketer Sir Ian Botham, and son of former Cardiff RFC player Liam Botham
 Liam Botham, Professional sportsman in Rugby Union, Rugby League and Cricket. Son of England cricket legend Sir Ian Botham
 Maggot (rapper), (real name Andrew Major) is a Welsh rapper, formerly of the Goldie Lookin Chain. 
 Natasha Cockram, Current Welsh marathon record holder and 2020 British Marathon Champion
 Percy Montgomery, South African international rugby union player
 Raymond Parsons, Former Chairman of Gloucestershire County Cricket Club
 Callum Taylor (Welsh cricketer), Current professional cricketer with Glamorgan

References

Communities in Torfaen
Villages in Torfaen